Robert Charles "Bob" Brown (born 9 February 1953) is an Australian former rugby union footballer. Brown, a fullback, was born in Parramatta, New South Wales, and claimed a total of 2 international rugby caps for Australia.

References

Australian rugby union players
Australia international rugby union players
1953 births
Living people
Rugby union players from Sydney
Rugby union fullbacks